The usual offices is a former euphemism which may refer to either:

 bathrooms or toilets as places of urination and defecation
 outhouses and other pit toilets.